Farrell's Ice Cream Parlour was an American ice cream parlor and sandwich chain that was founded in Portland, Oregon, in 1963. The chain became defunct following the closure of its last location in Brea, California, in 2019.

History
Farrell's Ice Cream Parlour was started at NW 21st Avenue in Portland, Oregon, by Bob Farrell and Ken McCarthy in 1963. Farrell's became known for their offer of a free ice cream sundae to children on their birthday. The parlors had an early 1900s theme, with employees wearing period dress and straw boater hats, and each location featured a player piano.

In 1972, the Farrell's chain was purchased by the Marriott Corporation. By 1975, there were 120 Farrell's nationwide.

Thereafter, sales dropped and most of the parlors were sold off in the 1980s. In 1982, Marriott sold the chain to a group of private investors. By 1990, almost all Farrell's locations had closed.

One of the last original Farrell's locations in Portland, located near the Lloyd Center mall, closed in 2001. At the time of its closing, it was privately owned and known as The Original Portland Ice Cream Parlor. The final original location closed in 2006 in Eugene, Oregon. At the time, it was operating under the name of Pearl Street Ice Cream Parlour. In 2009, there was a discussion of an eventual return to Portland, but nothing came of it.

In 2008, after a years-long legal battle over rights to the brand, Parlour Enterprises of Lake Forest, California, was confirmed as the owner and operator of Farrell's properties on the U.S. mainland. The company established a franchise model with original founder Bob Farrell as an advisor. They promptly opened seven Farrell's locations in California, including the Mountasia Family Fun Center in Santa Clarita; Rancho Cucamonga; downtown Brea; Riverside; Sacramento; and Buena Park. By 2014, there was a total of 8 restaurants with one each in Hawaii and Sacramento and the remainder in Southern California.

There were eight Farrell's locations in Hawaii. The last Farrell's in the state was operated by E Noa Corporation at Pearlridge shopping center in Aiea, Hawaii. After 10 years in service, it closed at the end of their lease in October 2016.

By 2016, Farrell's had accumulated $2 million in debt and was forced to start closing under-performing locations. The Mission Viejo location closed in January 2016.

In April 2016, the Farrell's inside Mountasia Family Fun Center was re-branded and named Lickity Split by Farrell's, featuring over-the-counter dining and a streamlined menu.

In August 2016, Farrell's was featured on CNBC's series The Profit, where Marcus Lemonis made a deal with the current owners and stakeholders of the Farrell's brand; three locations stayed open with a last push to bring back the iconic restaurant and ice cream parlour. Also in August 2016, the Sacramento and Rancho Cucamonga locations closed. The Santa Clarita location quietly closed sometime after the closure of the Rancho Cucamonga but before the closure of the Riverside location in late July 2017.

After purchasing the company, Lemonis immediately closed the Buena Park for renovations and reopened the restaurant in August 2017. Besides the Buena Park location, only the Brea location remained open.

The Buena Park location closed on December 30, 2018 leaving Brea as the last remaining location. The Brea location closed on June 8, 2019, leaving no remaining locations. While Lemonis owns 51% of the brand, he had no ownership in the Brea location.

Menu
The menu was printed as a tabloid-style newspaper. It featured appetizers, sandwiches, burgers, and dozens of different sundaes, as well as malts, shakes, sodas, and floats. Unusual offerings included a glass of soda water for 2 cents, and the traditional free sundae for customers celebrating a birthday. Some of the sundaes were huge and intended for a group to share. The largest, the "Zoo" sundae, was delivered with great fanfare by a number employees carrying it wildly around the restaurant on a stretcher,  accompanied by the sound of ambulance sirens.

One of the more amusing highlights of their original menu was a "Low-Calorie Diet" menu sheet you could theoretically turn to if you ate too much ice cream.  A bowl of "Bees Knees and Mosquito Knuckles" were among the fantasied foods that were featured in the joke-menu. Underneath the
fake meal plans was written "Anything Worth Eating Has Calories"

Sacramento location tragedy

On September 24, 1972, a privately owned Canadair Sabre jet (a variant of the F-86 Sabre) piloted by Richard Bingham failed to take off while leaving the Golden West Sport Aviation Air Show at Sacramento, California's Executive Airport. It went off the end of the runway and crashed into the ice cream parlour; 22 people died and 28 were injured.

In the news
On April 9, 1982, a small private plane crashed into the road and burst into flames in front of the Farrell's location in Torrance, California. The pilot and his two passengers died; no one on the ground was harmed.

In 1983, the Selective Service purchased Farrell's "Birthday Club" data and mailed warnings to young men telling them to register for the draft before their 18th birthday. Farrell's blamed the situation on an unauthorized sale by a list broker, and the government announced they would stop using the list.

In April 2014, an out-of-control automobile ran into a line of patrons waiting outside the Buena Park, California, location of Farrell's. One person died and six others were injured.

On August 23, 2016, the television show The Profit featured Farrell's Ice Cream Parlours, and frankly discussed the financial health of the company and their locations, as part of a reality television show. An investment was proposed as part of a turn-around for the company and as a result, Marcus Lemonis became the majority shareholder of the Farrell's franchise. He later took over ownership of the Buena Park location, but the restaurant closed in late 2018.

The episode "Sorry, Wrong Mother" of The Bob Newhart Show features a send up of the Farrell's custom of giving an overwhelming birthday greeting to patrons.  The ice cream employee is played by John Ritter.

References

1963 establishments in Oregon
2019 disestablishments in California
Companies based in Lake Forest, California
Defunct ice cream parlors
Defunct restaurant chains in the United States
Defunct restaurants in California
Ice cream parlors in the United States
Restaurants established in 1963
Restaurants disestablished in 2019
Theme restaurants
Restaurants in Oregon